Bearers of the Throne or ḥamlat al-arsh (حملة العرش) are a group of angels in Islam.

Description 
In Islamic traditions, they are often portrayed in zoomorphic forms. They are described as resembling different creatures: An eagle, a bull, a lion and a human. Other hadiths describes them with six wings and four faces. While according to a hadith transmitted from At-Targhib wat-Tarhib authored by ʻAbd al-ʻAẓīm ibn ʻAbd al-Qawī al-Mundhirī, the bearers of the throne were angels who shaped like a rooster, with their feet on the earth and their nape supporting the Throne of God in the highest sky. a number modern Islamic scholars from Imam Mohammad Ibn Saud Islamic University , and other institutes Yemen and Mauritania also agreed the soundness of this hadith by quoting the commentary from Ibn Abi al-Izz who supported this narrative.

These four angels are also held to be created from different elements: One from light, one from fire, one from water and one from mercy. It is also said they are so large that a journey from their earlobes to their shoulders would take seven hundred years. According to various Islamic tafsir scholars which compiled by Islamic University of Madinah and Indonesian religious ministry, the number of these angels will be added from four into eight angels during the Day of Resurrection. This interpretation were based on Qur'an chapter Al-Haqqa .

According to Al-Suyuti who quoted a Hadith which transmitted by Ibn al-Mubarak, archangel Israfil is one of the bearer of the throne.

Comparation in another religion 
The portrayal of these angels is comparable to the seraphim in the Book of Revelation. They might be identified with cherubim or seraphim of Jewish traditions.

See also 
 God’s throne in Islam
 Tetramorph
 List of angels in theology

Notes

References

 Angels in Islam
Classes of angels